Chris Wagner may refer to:

Chris Wagner (born 1991), American professional ice hockey player
Chris Wagner, American musician and member of The Latch Brothers
Chris Wagner, Canadian athlete who competed at the 1994 World Junior Championships in Athletics – Men's 400 metres hurdles 
Chris Wagner, editor of the magazine Strategy & Tactics